Eunidia variegata is a species of beetle in the family Cerambycidae. It was described by Thomson in 1857.

References

Eunidiini
Beetles described in 1857